1400 Tirela is an asteroid and the parent body of the Tirela family, located in the outer regions of the asteroid belt. It was discovered on 17 November 1936, by French astronomer Louis Boyer at the Algiers Observatory in North Africa. It was named after Charles Tirel, a friend of the discoverer.

Orbit and classification 

Tirela is the parent body of the Tirela family, a fairly large asteroid family, also known as the Klumpkea family, after its largest member 1040 Klumpkea. It orbits the Sun in the outer main belt at a distance of 2.4–3.9 AU once every 5 years and 6 months (2,018 days). Its orbit has an eccentricity of 0.23 and an inclination of 16° with respect to the ecliptic. The body's observation arc also begins at Lowell Observatory, with a precovery taken the night before its first identification.

Naming 

This minor planet was named after Charles Tirel a friend of discoverer Louis Boyer- The official naming citation was mentioned in The Names of the Minor Planets by Paul Herget in 1955.

Physical characteristics 

In both the Tholen- and SMASS-like taxonomy of the Small Solar System Objects Spectroscopic Survey (S3OS2), Tirela is a dark D-type asteroid. Conversely, the overall spectral type of the Tirela family is that of an S-type which agrees with the determined albedo (see below) by WISE and Akari.

Rotation period and poles 

In the early 2000s, a rotational lightcurve of Tirela was obtained from photometric observations by a group of Hungarian astronomers. Lightcurve analysis gave a rotation period of 13.356 hours with a brightness amplitude of 0.55 magnitude, superseding the result from a previous observation that gave a period of 8 hours. A 2016-published lightcurve, using modeled photometric data from the Lowell Photometric Database, gave a concurring sidereal period of  hours, as well as two spin axis of (58.0°, −80.0°) and (297.0°, −41.0°) in ecliptic coordinates (λ, β).

Diameter and albedo 

According to the surveys carried out by the Japanese Akari satellite and the NEOWISE mission of NASA's WISE telescope, Tirela measures between 14.67 and 15.697 kilometers in diameter and its surface has an albedo between 0.216 and 0.227. The Collaborative Asteroid Lightcurve Link assumes a standard albedo for carbonaceous asteroids of 0.057 and calculates a diameter of 29.21 kilometers based on an absolute magnitude of 11.4.

Notes

References

External links 
 Lightcurve Database Query (LCDB), at www.minorplanet.info
 Dictionary of Minor Planet Names, Google books
 Asteroids and comets rotation curves, CdR – Geneva Observatory, Raoul Behrend
 Discovery Circumstances: Numbered Minor Planets (1)-(5000) – Minor Planet Center
 
 

001400
Discoveries by Louis Boyer (astronomer)
Named minor planets
19361117